Kelly Smith is an English former professional footballer who played for both England and Great Britain between 1995 and 2014, and scored 46 international goals during that time. Smith scored all 46 goals for England in 116 appearances, making her the country's record goalscorer until Ellen White surpassed the record on 30 November 2021. A prolific scorer, former teammate and England captain Steph Houghton declared Smith to be "England's best-ever player" in 2015.

Smith made her international debut for England on 1 November 1995 in a 1−1 home draw with Italy, playing the entire UEFA Women's Euro 1997 qualifying match. At The Valley in London 18 days later, Smith scored her first international goal in a 5−0 win over Croatia, contributing again to England's successful Euro 1997 qualifying campaign. Smith scored her first international hat-trick against Hungary on 27 October 2005 in a 13−0 away win; it was the team's highest winning margin until England defeated Latvia 20−0 on 30 November 2021. In the 2009 Women's Euro final, Smith scored in the 6−2 loss to Germany, a defeat which prolonged England's deprivation of their first major honour. Smith managed 116 caps over a 20-year career with England, she was often considered one of the world's top female players with pundits, coaches and opponents frequently exclaiming praise. On 8 March 2013, Smith scored her final goal for England in a 4−4 draw in the 2013 Cyprus Cup. She announced her international retirement on 3 February 2015, citing her desire to move into coaching. 

Smith had a short spell with Great Britain in 2012, playing only four matches. She made her debut in a pre-tournament friendly against Sweden, in preparation for the 2012 Olympics. During the competition, Smith featured in the group matches against Brazil, Cameroon and New Zealand. Great Britain eventually left the tournament following a 2−0 defeat to Canada in the quarter-final, a match in which Smith did not feature.

International goals
Scores and results list her team's goal tally first, score column indicates score after each Smith goal. Every international goal scored by Smith was for England.

Hat-tricks

Statistics

See also
 List of women's footballers with 100 or more international caps
 Lists of hat-tricks
 List of international goals scored by Ellen White

References

England women's national football team
Smith, Kelly
Smith, Kelly
Smith, Kelly
Great Britain women's Olympic football team